Demirkaya is a village in the Siirt District of Siirt Province in Turkey. The village is populated by Kurds of the Botikan tribe and had a population of 103 in 2021.

The hamlet of Akarsu is attached to the village.

History 
The village was part of the Chaldean Catholic Eparchy of Seert of the Chaldean Catholic Church and had a population of 200 Assyrians in 1913.

References 

Villages in Siirt District
Kurdish settlements in Siirt Province
Historic Assyrian communities in Turkey